Wych Kaosayananda (born 1974), also known as Wych Kaos or Kaos, is a Thai film director.

Early life 
The son of Thai diplomat Kaosayananda, he lived and studied in Pakistan, where his father was posted in Islamabad as an ambassador.

Career 
His directorial debut was Fah, released in 1998, which at the time was the highest-budgeted film in the history of the Thai film industry, but failed in the Thai box office.

His second film and American debut (which he directed under the shortened name "Kaos") was the 2002 thriller Ballistic: Ecks vs. Sever, which upon release was widely panned by both critics and moviegoers as one of the worst films ever made. In March 2007, Rotten Tomatoes ranked the film number 1 among "The Worst of the Worst" movie list.

Kaosayananda's post-Ballistic films include Tekken 2: Kazuya's Revenge (2014), Zero Tolerance (2015) and One Night in Bangkok (2020).

Zero Tolerance was previously completed and released only in Vietnam under the title of Angels. Kaosayananda found it difficult to sell his film to distributors because Angels was more of a drama than an action film. Therefore, he decided to add action star Scott Adkins into the mix for marquee value and to re-shoot and re-edit the entire film in order to craft more of a streamlined actioner that would interest buyers. This re-edited version, entitled Zero Tolerance, is the cut of the film that has been released to the rest of the world.

Dead Earth tells a parallel story to Kaosayananda's The Driver, focusing on events that happen within the same post-apocalyptic world, with characters and locations intersecting between both films.

Filmography 

Cinematographer only
The Mark (2012)
The Mark: Redemption (2013)
Once Upon a Time in Vietnam (2013)
Invincible (2020)
The Gunrunner (TBA)

References

External links 

Wych Kaosayananda Interview on Anchor

1974 births
Living people
Thai expatriates in Pakistan
Wych Kaosayananda